Guenthner is a surname. Notable people with the surname include:

Franz Guenthner (born 1946), German linguist and professor
Louie R. Guenthner Jr. (1944–2012), American attorney and politician

See also
Günther (surname)